Rose of Sharon is a biblical expression, and a common name for several species of flower.

Rose of Sharon may also refer to:

Music
 "Rose of Sharon" (Mumford & Sons song), from the album Delta
 "Rose of Sharon" (Title Fight song), from the album Hyperview
 "Rose of Sharon" (William Billings song), a choral anthem by William Billings
 "Rose of Sharon", a song by Title Fight from Hyperview
 "Rose of Sharon", a song by Xiu Xiu from La Forêt
 Rose of Sharon: 100 Years of American Music (1770-1870), by Joel Frederiksen

Other uses
 Rose of Sharon, a 2006 film directed by Elliott Hong
 Rose of Sharon Joad, a character in John Steinbeck's 1939 novel The Grapes of Wrath
 a nickname for American football player Mike Sebastian (1910–1989)
 Rose of Sharon Cassidy, a character in Fallout: New Vegas.

See also
 
 Rose of Sharyn, a Killswitch Engage song on their album, The End of Heartache